Miriam Yeung (born 3 February 1974) is a Hong Kong actress and Cantopop diva. As of 2020, she has released more than 35 albums and has starred in more than 40 films. In 2012, Yeung won the Award for Best Actress at the 32nd Hong Kong Film Awards for portraying Cherie Yu in Love in the Buff.  

Yeung studied at the Holy Family Canossian College in Kowloon and was a registered nurse at the Princess Margaret Hospital in Kwai Chung, Hong Kong. She began her career in entertainment after coming third in the TVB 14th annual New Talent Singing Awards competition in 1995.

Career

Music
She began her career as a singer and actress after coming third in the TVB 14th annual New Talent Singing Awards competition in 1995, co-organised with Capital Artists.

Yeung has released more than 40 albums in Cantonese and Mandarin. Many of her songs have been mainstream hits and award winners, such as "Maiden's Prayer" (少女的祈禱), "Sisters" (姊妹), "Unfortunately I'm an Aquarius" (可惜我是水瓶座) and "Small City, Big Things" (小城大事).

She also performed a Cantonese version of It's A Small World, at the opening of It's A Small World at the Hong Kong Disneyland theme park in 2008.

Acting
As an actress, Yeung has appeared in over 30 films with a total box office of around US$50 million worldwide, and had voice roles in three Korean and Thai movies. She won the Most Popular Artiste Award at Italy's Udine Far East Film Festival in 2002.

Her notable works include Sound of Colors , Drink, Drank, Drunk , Hooked on You , Perfect Wedding , Love in a Puff and Love in the Buff.

In 2011, Yeung won her first Best Actress award for Perfect Wedding at the 17th Hong Kong Film Critics Society Award. In 2013 she won another Best Actress award for Love in the Buff at the 32nd Hong Kong Film Awards.

In 2019, Yeung starred as the female lead in TVB drama Wonder Women. It was her first small screen appearance in 8 years. She won the Most Popular Female Character award at the 2019 TVB Anniversary Awards along with Selena Lee.

Other work
In 2005, she was elected one of the Ten Outstanding Young Persons of Hong Kong by the Junior Chamber International Hong Kong.

Yeung is also involved in literature and drawing. She published "Miriam experience of school entry" in 1998, which encompasses short passages about her reflections on life, travel journals, and sharing with friends. In 1997, she made her first attempt to write her own lyrics to a song named "The Writing is on the Wall" ("字跡").

Personal life
In 2007, Yeung began dating ex-VRF member Real Ting Chi-ko. The couple married on 11 August 2009 in Las Vegas. After returning to Hong Kong, the couple held two wedding banquets in the Grand Hyatt Hotel in Wan Chai on 20 December 2010 and in L'hotel Island South in Aberdeen on 24 December 2010, inviting over 500 guests. She gave birth to their child Torres Ting, nicknamed "RMB" which means "Real & Miriam’s Baby", on 5 June 2012.

Discography

Filmography

Film

Television series
{| class="wikitable sortable"
|-
! Year
! English title
! Original title
! Role
! class="unsortable" | Notes
|-
| 1997 || The Disappearance || 隱形怪傑 || Saan Saan  ||
|-
| 1998 || A Recipe for the Heart || 美味天王 || Yao Ka-ka  ||
|-
| 1998 || Moments of Endearment || 外父唔怕做 || Chung Lok-yee  ||
|-
| 1999 || Man's Best Friend || 寵物情緣 || Dau Dau || Voice
|-
| 2001||A Taste of Love|| 美味情緣 ||Chou Bo-time || 
|-
| 2003||Hearts of Fencing|| 當四葉草碰上劍尖時  || ||  Cameo
|-
| 2006 ||Stephen's Diary|| 老馮日記 || || Cameo
|-
| 2006 ||Twist Love||讓愛自由 ||A-chun || 
|-
|2007||Love at First Fight|| 武十郎 || Wu Shi-lang || 
|-
|2007||Colours of Love|| 森之愛情 ||Nicole || 
|-
|2009||ICAC Investigators 2009|| 廉政行動2009|| ICAC investigator Yeung Mei-kei  || 
|-
|2009||The Bronze Teeth IV||鐵齒銅牙紀曉嵐4 ||Qianqian ||

Awards and nominations

References

External links

 Miriam Yeung's official website
 
 

1974 births
Living people
20th-century Hong Kong women singers
Hong Kong film actresses
Hong Kong television actresses
Cantopop singers
Hong Kong Mandopop singers
Hong Kong nurses
New Talent Singing Awards contestants
TVB actors
20th-century Hong Kong actresses
21st-century Hong Kong actresses
21st-century Hong Kong women singers
The Amazing Race contestants